The Socialist Studies Bulletin was published by the Society for Socialist Studies and contained membership news and updates as well as academic articles and commentaries. It was started in 1985, replacing Newsletter, which was launched in 1979. The Bulletin ceased publication in 2005 and it was replaced by Socialist Studies/Études Socialistes. The headquarters was in Winnipeg.

References

1985 establishments in Manitoba
2005 disestablishments in Canada
Defunct political magazines published in Canada
French-language magazines published in Canada
Magazines established in 1985
Magazines disestablished in 2005
Magazines published in Manitoba
Mass media in Winnipeg
Socialist magazines